The 1999 United States House of Representatives special election in Louisiana's 1st congressional district was held on May 29, 1999, to select the successor to Bob Livingston (R) who resigned due to the discovery of an extramarital affair.

On May 1, nine candidates, mostly Republicans, competed on the same ballot. However, since no candidate was able to achieve a majority, a runoff was held at the end of the month.

Runoff
Former State Representative David Vitter narrowly won in the runoff over former Louisiana governor Dave Treen and would later become a United States Senator.

References

Louisiana 1999 01
Louisiana 1999 01
1999 01
Louisiana 01
United States House of Representatives 01
United States House of Representatives 1999 01